Eupithecia pertusata is a moth in the family Geometridae. It is found the United States in south-western Texas, Arizona and New Mexico.

The wingspan is about 17 mm.

References

Moths described in 1938
pertusata
Moths of North America